Ram Chandra Singh Pradhan  (born 10 November 1967) is an Indian politician and a member of Legislative Council, Uttar Pradesh of India. Pradhan elected as Member of Legislative Council from Lucknow-Unnao seat 2022.

Early life and education 
Ram Chandra Pradhan was born in Bhagwati Prasad Singh's house on 10 November 1967 in the Gram Sabha Dhanewa of District Lucknow. His father was a farmer by profession. He completed his primary education from the village government school. After that he enrolled in the Lucknow University in order to complete his graduation in Bachelor's of arts. Due to his early interest in politics, he entered into student politics and contested the election of General Secretary in 1986 and won by a large margin of votes.

After student life, he made his full debut in active politics, and from 1999 to 2003, was the district president of Bahujan Samaj Party from Lucknow district.

Also, he remained the mandal coordinator of Bahujan Samaj Party from 2003 to 2012, and in charge of Bundelkhand from 2003 to 2008. Had been a member of legislative council of Bahujan Samaj Party from May 2009 to April 2015. And also, had been the chairman of PCF from 2009 to 2012.

References

Members of the Uttar Pradesh Legislative Council
1967 births
Living people
Bharatiya Janata Party politicians from Uttar Pradesh